The Tampa Bay area is a major metropolitan area surrounding Tampa Bay on the Gulf Coast of Florida in the United States. It includes the main cities of Tampa, St. Petersburg, and Clearwater. It is the 18th-largest metropolitan area in the United States, with a population of 3,175,275 as of the 2020 U.S. Census.

The exact boundaries of the metro area can differ in different contexts. Hillsborough County and Pinellas County (including the cities of Tampa, St. Petersburg, Clearwater, and various smaller communities) make up the most limited definition. This area includes most of the Tampa Bay bayfront, aside from the far southern portion which lies in Manatee County. The United States Census Bureau defines the Tampa–St. Petersburg–Clearwater Metropolitan Statistical Area (MSA) as including Hillsborough and Pinellas Counties as well as Hernando and Pasco Counties to the north; and it is the 18th-largest MSA in the country. Unlike most large metropolitan areas, Tampa does not belong to any combined statistical area and is the second-largest MSA in the United States not to belong to one (after San Diego-Chula Vista-Carlsbad).

Other definitions of the Tampa Bay area include:
the four counties in the MSA plus Citrus and Manatee Counties, used by the Tampa Bay Regional Planning Council
the four counties in the MSA plus Citrus, Manatee and Sarasota Counties, used by the Tampa Bay Area Regional Transportation Authority
the four counties in the MSA plus Citrus, Manatee, Sarasota and Polk Counties, used by the Tampa Bay Partnership and the Tampa Bay media market.

This wider area may also be known as West Central Florida as part of Central Florida.

History
When the Spanish first arrived in the area of Tampa Bay, they encountered people of the Safety Harbor culture. About 20 sites with temple mounds have been found around Tampa Bay, with several in Pinellas County. Best known of the Safety Harbor people was the chiefdom of Tocobaga, which was likely located at the Safety Harbor site in Philippe Park in northern Pinellas County.

Tampa–St. Petersburg–Clearwater Metropolitan Statistical Area 
The population of the Tampa Bay MSA is 3,175,275 people as of the 2020 United States census.

The following is a list of principal cities and unincorporated communities, including census-designated places (CDPs), located in the Tampa–St. Petersburg–Clearwater MSA based on the 2010 U.S. Census:

Principal cities
Each of these cities has a population in excess of 250,000 inhabitants:
Tampa
St. Petersburg

More than 100,000 inhabitants
Clearwater
Lakeland
Riverview (CDP)
Brandon (CDP)
Spring Hill (CDP)

More than 10,000 inhabitants

Demographics

According to the 2000 U.S. Census, the Tampa–St. Petersburg–Clearwater MSA consists of the following ethnic demographics:

Age

Race and ethnicity

Hispanic or Latino by origin

Geography

The Tampa Bay area is located along Tampa Bay which it is named for. Pinellas County and St. Petersburg, Florida lies on a peninsula between Tampa Bay and the Gulf of Mexico, and much of the city of Tampa, Florida lies on a smaller peninsula jutting out into Tampa Bay.

Climate

The Tampa Bay area has a humid subtropical climate (Koppen Cfa) with hot, humid summers, with daily thunderstorms,  drier, predominantly sunny winters, and warm-to-hot springs with a pronounced dry season maximum. On average, two days experience frost per year in the cooler parts of the Tampa Bay area, less than annually in the coastal parts. However, hard freezes (low temperatures below ) are very rare, occurring only a few times in the last 75 years. The United States Department of Agriculture designates the area as being in hardiness zones 9b and 10a. Coastal parts of the Tampa Bay area closely border a tropical savanna climate (As) with many tropical microclimates due to maritime influences of the Gulf of Mexico and the 400-square-mile Tampa Bay. Plant climate-indicator species such as coconut palms and royal palms, as well as other elements of south Florida's native tropical flora, reach their northern limits of reliable culture and native range in the area. Highs usually range between  year-round. St. Petersburg's all-time record high is exactly .

Pinellas County lies on a peninsula between Tampa Bay and the Gulf of Mexico, and much of the city of Tampa lies on a smaller peninsula jutting out into Tampa Bay. This proximity to large bodies of water both moderates local temperatures and introduces large amounts of humidity into the atmosphere. In general, the communities farthest from the coast have more extreme temperature differences, both during a single day and throughout the seasons of the year.

Economy

As of July 1, 2019, the largest employers within the Tampa Bay area are:

Finance and insurance
Nearly one in four of the state's business and information services firms resides in Tampa Bay. These firms range from financial services firms to information technology providers to professional services organizations such as law firms, accounting firms, engineering firms, consulting and more. As a gateway to the Florida High Tech Corridor, Tampa Bay is home to many information technology firms along with many business services providers.

Financial services firms:
Bank of America
JPMorgan Chase
Citigroup
Wells Fargo
Depository Trust & Clearing Corporation
Raymond James Financial
Franklin Templeton
Metlife
USAA
Progressive Insurance
Transamerica
State Farm
New York Life

Health care 
With more than 50 hospitals, dozens of clinics and ambulatory care centers, the Tampa Bay has an abundance of top-rated health care facilities for children and adults. The region also has a wealth of well-trained medical professionals—nearly 53,000 nurses and more than 9,200 physicians (including physician assistants)—provide care to Tampa Bay residents and visitors every year.

Information technology
Tampa Bay serves as the gateway to the Florida High Tech Corridor which spans 23 counties. Created as a partnership between the University of South Florida, University of Central Florida and now including the University of Florida, the Florida High Tech Corridor promotes the growth of the high-tech industry across Central Florida.

Higher education and research
Academic research is a key component of high-tech growth and a powerful economic engine. The presence of cutting-edge research in the region is vital to technology transfer, which enables innovative ideas discovered in academia to achieve commercialization in the marketplace. Tampa Bay has several powerhouse research centers that are engaged in both pure scientific research and aggressively pursuing technology transfer to enrich people's lives.

Researchers at the University of South Florida's Nanomaterials and Nanomanufacturing Research Center (NNRC), H. Lee Moffitt Cancer Center and the Center for Ocean Technology at USF's College of Marine Science are researching how to use nanotechnology for a myriad of targeted uses including drug delivery, mechanized microsurgery, customized laser microchips, ways to turn sunlight into electricity, purifying water, storing hydrogen in small nanotubes, designing and developing marine sensors using microelectromechanical systems (MEMS) and curing cancer.
University of Tampa is located in Downtown Tampa, Florida on the Hillsborough River and is a historic university linked back to Teddy Roosevelt.

Housing
In 2008 the area's construction based boom was brought to a sudden halt by the financial crisis of 2007–2010, and by 2009 it was ranked as the fourth worst performing housing market in the United States.

Changes in house prices for the area are publicly tracked on a regular basis using the Case–Shiller index; the statistic is published by Standard & Poor's and is also a component of S&P's 20-city composite index of the value of the U.S. residential real estate market.

Avionics, defense, and marine electronics
The University of South Florida's Center for Ocean Technology, which has been a leader in microelectromechanical systems research and development and has been using the technology to collect biological and chemical data to monitor water quality, provided underwater technology for port security at the 2004 Republican National Convention. USF's Center for Robot-Assisted Search and Rescue used its miniature robots to assist rescue teams at Ground Zero following the September 11 terrorist attacks.

Tampa Bay is also the location of three major military installations, MacDill Air Force Base, Coast Guard Air Station Clearwater and Coast Guard Station St. Petersburg. MacDill AFB is home to the 6th Air Mobility Wing (6 AMW) of the Air Mobility Command (AMC) and the 927th Air Refueling Wing (927 ARW) of the Air Force Reserve Command (AFRC).  Both wings share flight operations of a fleet of KC-135R Stratotanker aircraft and the 6 AMW also operates a fleet of C-37A Gulfstream V aircraft. MacDill AFB also hosts multiple tenant organizations, to include two major combatant commands: United States Central Command (USCENTCOM), which directs military operations in Afghanistan, Iraq, and the Middle East; and United States Special Operations Command (USSOCOM), which has responsibility for all special operations forces in the U.S. Armed Forces. CGAS Clearwater is located at the St. Petersburg–Clearwater International Airport.  It is the largest air station in the United States Coast Guard, operating HC-130H Hercules aircraft and MH-60T Jayhawk helicopters with principal missions focused on search and rescue, counternarcotics interdiction, and homeland security.  The HC-130 aircraft are slated to be replaced by new HC-27J Spartan aircraft beginning in 2017.  Coast Guard Station St. Petersburg is located on the site of the former Coast Guard Air Station St. Petersburg at Albert Whitted Airport.  It is home to Coast Guard Sector St. Petersburg and is homeport for the USCGC Resolute (WMEC 620), USCGC Venturous (WMEC 625), and numerous smaller cutters and patrol boats.

Education

Primary and secondary education is provided by the school districts of the individual counties making up the region.

The area is home to several institutions of higher learning, including the main campus of the University of South Florida in Tampa and its satellite campus in St. Petersburg. Eckerd College in St. Petersburg, the University of Tampa, Florida College in Temple Terrace, and Trinity College in New Port Richey are all four-year institutions located in the area. Embry–Riddle Aeronautical University and Troy University also maintain satellite education centers at MacDill AFB. Nova Southeastern University also has a regional campus in Clearwater.

There are two law schools in the area, Stetson University College of Law and Thomas M. Cooley Law School. Stetson University has campuses in Gulfport and Tampa, while Thomas M. Cooley Law school is located in Riverview.

Hillsborough Community College, St. Petersburg College, Polk State College, and Pasco-Hernando State College are community colleges serving the area.

Culture 

The Tampa Bay area is home to a high concentration of quality art museums. Long established communities, particularly those near the bay such as Cuban influenced Ybor City, Old Northeast in St. Petersburg, and Palma Ceia and Hyde Park in Tampa contain historic architecture.
Fresh seafood and locally grown produce are available in many restaurants and in weekly farmers' markets in multiple urban centers in the area. Yuengling, the largest American-owned brewer, operates a brewery in Tampa, as does the highly regarded craft brewer Cigar City Brewing. The area is also known for its influence on heavy metal music, specifically death metal. Within both the Florida death metal scene and broader genre Tampa Bay became known as the "capital of death metal."

Arts and culture make a big impact in Tampa Bay.  In a single year, the economic impact of the cultural institutions in the Tampa Bay area was $521.3 million, according to a recent PricewaterhouseCoopers study.  In 2004 5.6 million people attended plays, musical performances, museum exhibits, and other cultural institutions in Tampa Bay, supporting 7,800 jobs.

Museums

Museum of Fine Arts near the Pier in downtown St. Petersburg
Salvador Dalí Museum in downtown St. Petersburg
Florida International Museum at St. Petersburg College in downtown St. Petersburg
Florida Holocaust Museum in downtown St. Petersburg
Tampa Museum of Art in downtown Tampa
USF Contemporary Art Museum on the USF Tampa campus
Florida Museum of Photographic Arts in downtown Tampa
Museum of Science and Industry adjacent to USF's Tampa campus
Tampa Bay Automobile Museum in Pinellas Park
Leepa-Rattner Museum of Art on the Tarpon Springs Campus of St. Petersburg College
 The Royal Theater & Manhattan Casino Historic Landmarks in St. Petersburg
 The Carter J. Woodson African-American Museum St. Petersburg
 Tampa Bay History Center
 Ybor City Museum State Park in Ybor City

Performing arts halls

Straz Center for the Performing Arts in Tampa
Ruth Eckerd Hall in Clearwater
Mahaffey Theater in St. Petersburg
Tarpon Springs Performing Arts Center

Cultural events
Gasparilla Pirate Festival held every January in Tampa
Florida State Fair held every February in Tampa
Florida Strawberry Festival  held every March in Plant City
Clearwater Jazz Holiday held every October in Coachman Park in downtown Clearwater; in its 32nd year
Guavaween, a Latin-flavored Halloween celebration held every October in the Ybor City section of Tampa
Festa Italiana, annual festival of Italian heritage held every April in Ybor City, Tampa's Latin Quarter

Recreation

The Tampa Bay area is highly noted for its beaches, with the warm, blue gulf waters and nearly 70 miles of barriers islands from North Pinellas south to Venice, attracting tourists from all over the world. Three of the beaches in this area, Fort De Soto's North Beach (2005), Caladesi Island (2008), and Sarasota's Siesta Key (2011) have been named by Dr. Beach as America's Top Beach. The 15th IIFA Awards would be held at Tampa Bay Area in April 2014.

Sports attractions, in addition to the teams listed below, include many professional quality golf courses, tennis courts, and pools. Ybor and the Channel District in Tampa, downtown St. Petersburg, and the beaches all along the coast all attract a vibrant nightlife.

Theme parks
Adventure Island in Tampa
Busch Gardens in Tampa
Dinosaur World in Plant City
Weeki Wachee Springs in Hernando County
Legoland Florida in Winter Haven, Polk County

Zoos and aquariums

Lowry Park Zoo in Tampa
Florida Aquarium in Tampa
Clearwater Marine Aquarium in Clearwater
Suncoast Seabird Sanctuary in Indian Shores

Botanical gardens
Florida Botanical Gardens, part of the Pinewood Cultural Park in Largo
Sunken Gardens in St. Petersburg, a former tourist attraction now run by the City of St. Petersburg
USF Botanical Gardens in Tampa

Notable public parks and recreation areas
The Tampa Bay area is home to an extensive system of state, county, and city parks. Hillsborough River State Park in Thonotosassa is one of Florida's original eight state parks and Honeymoon Island State Park, near Dunedin, is Florida's most visited state park.  Pinellas County is home to the Fred Marquis Pinellas Trail, a 37-mile running and cycling trail over a former railroad bed connecting Tarpon Springs to St. Petersburg. Skyway Fishing Pier State Park, the remnants of the approaches to the original Sunshine Skyway Bridge forms the world's largest fishing pier in Pinellas and Manatee counties. The shallow waters and many mangrove islands of the bay and gulf make the area popular with kayakers. The gulf is also home to a large number of natural and artificial coral reefs that are popular for fishing and scuba diving. Away from the coast, Circle B Bar Reserve in Lakeland (Polk county) has been designated as a Great Florida Birding Trail site, a program of the Florida Fish and Wildlife Conservation Commission.

Sports

Sports teams

The Tampa Bay Area is home to three major professional sports teams: the Buccaneers (NFL), Rays (MLB), and Lightning (NHL). The Tampa Bay area also hosts a number of minor-league and college teams.

MLB spring training teams 

Major League Baseball teams have come to the Tampa Bay area for spring training since the Chicago Cubs trained at Tampa's Plant Field in 1913 and the St. Louis Browns trained at St. Petersburg's Coffee Pot Park in 1914. Grapefruit League games are still a favorite pastime for both residents and tourists alike every March. The following five Major League Baseball teams play spring training games in the Tampa Bay area:

The New York Yankees in Tampa
The Philadelphia Phillies in Clearwater
The Toronto Blue Jays in Dunedin
The Pittsburgh Pirates in Bradenton
The Detroit Tigers in Lakeland

Minor League baseball
Minor League baseball has also been a constant in the Tampa Bay area for over a century. The Tampa Smokers, St. Petersburg Saints, Lakeland Highlanders, and Bradenton Growers were charter members of the original Florida State League, which began play in 1919. Current local teams include:

Florida State League (Class A)
The Tampa Tarpons: George M. Steinbrenner Field in Tampa
The Clearwater Threshers: Spectrum Field in Clearwater
The Dunedin Blue Jays: TD Ballpark in Dunedin
The Bradenton Marauders: LECOM Park in Bradenton
The Lakeland Flying Tigers: Publix Field at Joker Marchant Stadium in Lakeland

The area is also home to several affiliates of the Gulf Coast League, a rookie league in which many young players gain their first experience in professional baseball.

Basketball
The Tampa Bay area does not have a basketball team in the NBA; the Orlando Magic are the closest team to the area, 85 miles east. The Toronto Raptors made Tampa their temporary home prior to the 2020–21 NBA season during the COVID-19 pandemic, necessitated by restrictions on travel between Canada and the United States that were in effect. Their "home" games were played at Amalie Arena.

The Tampa Bay area has had several teams in minor basketball leagues. The Tampa Bay Titans play in The Basketball League (TBL).  Their home games are played at Pasco–Hernando State College. The St. Pete Tide and the Tampa Gunners play in the Florida Basketball Association (FBA).  The Tide's home games are played at St. Petersburg Catholic High School, and the Gunners are a travel team.

Sporting events

Major League sports
 Five Super Bowls have been held in Tampa: Super Bowl XVIII in 1984, Super Bowl XXV in 1991, Super Bowl XXXV in 2001, Super Bowl XLIII in 2009, and Super Bowl LV in 2021.  Super Bowls XVIII and XXV were played at Tampa Stadium, while Super Bowls XXXV, XLIII and LV were played at Raymond James Stadium. The 1978 AFC–NFC Pro Bowl was held in Tampa at Tampa Stadium.
 The 2008 MLB World Series; Games 1 and 2 were played in St. Petersburg at Tropicana Field.
 The 1999 NHL All-Star Game was held in Tampa at the Ice Palace. It was held again in 2018, having been renamed Amalie Arena by then.
 The 2004 NHL Stanley Cup Finals; Games 1, 2, 5 and 7 were played in Tampa at the St. Pete Times Forum, Games 1, 2, and 5 of the 2015 Stanley Cup Final were played at Amalie Arena and Games 1, 2, and 5 of the 2021 Stanley Cup Final were played at Amalie Arena .

NCAA sports
 The NCAA football Outback Bowl is held annually at Raymond James Stadium, usually on January 1. The Gasparilla Bowl is also held annually at Raymond James Stadium, usually in December. It began in 2008 at Tropicana Field in St. Petersburg until moving to Tampa in 2018. The NCAA football East–West Shrine Game is held annually at Tropicana Field since 2012, usually in January.
 The 2017 College Football Playoff National Championship was held at Raymond James Stadium on January 9, 2017.
 Two NCAA football ACC Championship Games (2008 and 2009) have been played in Tampa at Raymond James Stadium.
 Amalie Arena in Tampa has been the site for various rounds of NCAA Men's and Women's basketball championship tournament over the years, as well as conference tournaments. The 1999 NCAA Men's Final Four was held in St. Petersburg at Tropicana Field. The 2008, 2015 NCAA Women's Final Four and 2019 NCAA Division I women's basketball tournament Final Four were held in Tampa at the Tampa Bay Times Forum/Amalie Arena.
 Five NCAA Division I Men's Soccer Championships have been held in Tampa: 1978, 1979, 1980, 1990 and 1991
 The 2012 and 2016 NCAA Men's Frozen Four were held in Tampa at the Tampa Bay Times Forum/Amalie Arena.
 Tampa will host the 2023 Division I NCAA Women's Volleyball Championship, the 2023 NCAA Division I Men's Frozen Four, the 2025 NCAA Division I Women's Basketball Final Four and the 2026 NCAA Division I Men's Basketball First and Second Rounds, all at Amalie Arena.

Transportation

Air

Tampa International Airport is the largest airport in the region with 21 carriers and more than 17 million passengers served last year. In addition to the recent opening of a new terminal, improvements are being planned to handle 25 million passengers by 2020.

St. Petersburg–Clearwater International Airport provides access to commercial airliners, and smaller charter craft. The airport is currently planning an expansion which will include new terminal facilities and runway extension. Dotting the landscape throughout the area, are many general aviation airports for the aircraft enthusiast and smaller corporate jets.

Rail
Amtrak provides passenger rail service from Union Station in Tampa. CSX provides freight rail service for the entire Tampa Bay region.

Water

The Cross-Bay Ferry has connected Tampa's Channelside District to Downtown St. Petersburg since 2016. The Pirate Water Taxi, also operating since 2016, has several stops along the waterways in the vicinity of Tampa's downtown area and Channelside District.

Transit systems

Bus service is provided in Hillsborough County by Hillsborough Area Regional Transit (HART), in Pinellas County by Pinellas Suncoast Transit Authority (PSTA), in Pasco County by Pasco County Public Transportation and in Hernando County by THE Bus. HART and PSTA provide express services between Tampa and Pinellas County, and PSTA provides connections to Pasco County. HART also operates the TECO streetcar between Downtown Tampa and Ybor City. In 2013, HART also began operating a Bus rapid transit system called MetroRapid that runs from Downtown Tampa to the University of South Florida.

On July 1, 2007, an intermodal transportation authority was created to serve the seven-county Tampa Bay area. The Tampa Bay Area Regional Transportation Authority (TBARTA) was formed to develop bus, rapid transit, and other transportation options for the region.

Roads and freeways
The Tampa Bay area is served by these interstate highways.
 Interstate 4
 Interstate 75
 Interstate 175
 Interstate 275
 Interstate 375
Hillsborough County is also served by other roadways such as the Lee Roy Selmon Expressway (SR 618) which commutes workers from Brandon into downtown Tampa and the Veterans Expressway/Suncoast Parkway (SR 589) which serves traffic from the Citrus/Hernando County border southward into Tampa. Both of these highways, which are built to limited access freeway standards, are toll roads as is the connecting junction between the Selmon Expressway and Interstate 4.

In Pinellas County, U.S. 19 is the main north–south route through the county, and is being upgraded to freeway standards complete with frontage roads to ease congestion through the north part of the county.  Also, the Bayside Bridge allows traffic to go from Clearwater into  without having to use U.S. 19.

The Courtney Campbell Causeway (SR 60) is one of the three roads that connect Pinellas County to Hillsborough County across the bay. The other two are the Howard Frankland Bridge (I-275) and Gandy Bridge (U.S. 92). The Sunshine Skyway Bridge is part of I-275 and connects Bradenton and other Manatee County and Sarasota County commuters into Pinellas County.

See also

 Media in the Tampa Bay area
 Central Florida
 Florida Suncoast
 United States metropolitan area

References

 
Hillsborough County, Florida
Manatee County, Florida
Pasco County, Florida
Pinellas County, Florida
Regions of Florida
Central Florida